Chauncey Steele may refer to:

Chauncey Steele, Jr. (1914-1988), American tennis player, father of Chauncey Steele III
Chauncey Steele III (born 1944), American tennis player, son of Chauncey Steele, Jr.